Leucopogon hamulosus is a species of flowering plant in the heath family Ericaceae and is endemic to the south-west of Western Australia. It was first formally described in 1904 by Ernst Georg Pritzel in Botanische Jahrbücher für Systematik, Pflanzengeschichte und Pflanzengeographie from specimens he collected near Mingenew. The specific epithet (hamulosus) means "having small hooks" referring to the tips of the leaves.

Leucopogon hamulosus occurs in the Avon Wheatbelt, Coolgardie, Esperance Plains, Geraldton Sandplains, Mallee, Murchison and Swan Coastal Plain bioregions of south-western Western Australia and is listed under the name Styphelia hamulosa as "not threatened", by the Government of Western Australia Department of Biodiversity, Conservation and Attractions.

References

hamulosus
Ericales of Australia
Flora of Western Australia
Plants described in 1904
Taxa named by Ernst Pritzel